APOP Paphos (Athlitikos Podosfairikos Omilos Pafos; "Athletic Football Club Paphos") was a Cypriot football club based in the city of Paphos. Founded in  1953,  playing between the First and Second Division.

History
In contrast with the other Districts of Cyprus and other major towns, which had permanent teams in First Division, Paphos did not have such a team as the two clubs of the town, APOP Paphos and Evagoras Paphos, could not remain in First Division for many years. For this reason the two clubs were merged to form AEP Paphos F.C. as the people of Paphos wanted a permanent team in First Division.

Trophies
Cypriot Second Division:
Champions (6): 1966, 1971, 1973, 1975, 1977, 1996

References

 
Association football clubs disestablished in 2000
Defunct football clubs in Cyprus
Association football clubs established in 1953
1953 establishments in Cyprus
2000 disestablishments in Cyprus